Çarpışma (English title: Crash) is a Turkish action thriller television series starring Kıvanç Tatlıtuğ, Elçin Sangu, Onur Saylak, Melisa Aslı Pamuk and Alperen Duymaz. It was premiered on Show TV on November 22, 2018, and concluded on May 30, 2019.

Plot 
Kadir Adalı is the Chief Commissioner of the Organized Crime Branch of the Istanbul Police Department. The moment he loses his wife and daughter in a terrorist act, his happy family life is destroyed. Feeling very sorry for what had happened and suffering from this loss, he decided to end his life. Without realizing it, he causes a catastrophe that changes the lives of four people. Four cars, four people, four lives, four destinies collide. In one of the cars is his childhood friend Zeynep, with whom he grew up in an orphanage and was about to be married, but he refused to do so because of his strong desire to work in the police as his father was a police officer who was killed during his duty. So, Kadir marries another friend from the orphanage, Aslı, instead. Zeynep then marries Galip Tunç and starts working as a bank manager and gives birth to a daughter named Aylin, but Galip owes a mob that kidnaps her daughter Aylin after Galip escapes from Turkey and asks Zeynep to pay her husband's debts. Slowly  And for this reason, she robs the bank where she works. After her arrest, she asks Kadir for help to save her daughter. In another car is Zeynep's lawyer, Cemre Gür, the daughter of Veli's lawyer, Selim, who is engaged to Demir. One of them, Kerem, a powerful friend in the fourth car, stabbed him. The Kerem partner, Yakup, uses this recording to blacken Demir and Belma.

Cast 
Kıvanç Tatlıtuğ as Kadir Adalı
Elçin Sangu as Zeynep Tunç
Onur Saylak as Veli Cevher
Melisa Aslı Pamuk as Cemre Gür
Alperen Duymaz as Kerem Korkmaz
Erkan Can as Haydar
Mustafa Uğurlu as Selim Gür
Rojda Demirer as Belma Gür
Merve Çağıran as Meral
Hakan Kurtaş as Demir
İsmail Demirci as Galip Tunç
Gonca Cilasun sa Serpil Korkmaz
Yıldırım Şimşek as Ömer Korkmaz 
Furkan Kalabalık as Adem
Gökçen Çiftçi as Aylin Tunç
Efecan Şenolsun as Yakup
Buçe Buse Kahraman as Meltem
Sevtap Özaltun as Aslı Adalı
Merve Nil Güder as Deniz Adalı
Ayşe İrem İpek as young Zeynep 
Kivanç Gedük as young Kadir
Ali Surmeli as Arif/Zarif/Cansiz, a sadistic, deranged serial killer, Kadir's biological father and the series' main antagonist.
Ivo Arakov as Ivan

Awards and nominations

International broadcasts

References

External links 
  
 

2018 Turkish television series debuts
2019 Turkish television series endings
Turkish drama television series
Turkish action television series
Show TV original programming
Television series by Ay Yapım
Turkish-language television shows
Television shows set in Istanbul
Television series produced in Istanbul
Television series set in the 2010s